Adam Knioła (7 February 1911 – 26 December 1942) was a Polish footballer. He played in two matches for the Poland national football team from 1931 to 1935. He was killed in the Auschwitz concentration camp during World War II.

References

External links
 

1911 births
1942 deaths
Polish footballers
Poland international footballers
Place of birth missing
Association footballers not categorized by position
Polish people who died in Auschwitz concentration camp